Holomictic lakes are lakes that have a uniform temperature and density from surface to bottom at a specific time during the year, which allows the lake waters to mix in the absence of stratification.

Details
Holomictic lakes mix at least occasionally, in contrast to meromictic lakes.  Most lakes on Earth are holomictic; meromictic lakes are rare, although they may be less rare than commonly thought. Amictic lakes are sealed off by ice and never mix.

There are four types of holomictic lakes: 
 Polymictic (mixing many times annually)
 Cold Monomictic (mixing once annually; exhibiting negative stratification)
 Warm Monomictic (mixing once annually; exhibiting positive stratification)
 Dimictic (mixing twice annually)
 Oligomictic (mixing less than once annually)

See also
 Thermocline

References

External links
"Circulation: annual patterns of dimictic lakes" at Encyclopædia Britannica Online

Lakes by type